Masdevallia vargasii is a species of orchid found from southern Colombia into central Bolivia and Guyana.

References

External links 

vargasii
Orchids of Bolivia
Orchids of Colombia
Orchids of Guyana